RoboCop is a beat 'em up / run and gun video game developed and published by Data East for arcades in 1988] based on the 1987 film of the same name. It was sub-licensed to Data East by Ocean Software, who obtained the rights from Orion Pictures at the script stage. Data East and Ocean Software subsequently adapted the arcade game for home computers.

The game was a critical and commercial success. The arcade game was the highest-grossing arcade game of 1988 in Hong Kong, and reached number-two on Japan's monthly Game Machine arcade charts. On home computers, the game sold over  copies worldwide, and it was especially successful in the United Kingdom where it was the best-selling home computer game of the 1980s.

Gameplay 

The gameplay is similar to Data East's arcade game Bad Dudes Vs. DragonNinja, released earlier the same year. Robocop includes elements from both beat 'em up and run and gun video games.

Release 
In 1988, Ocean adapted Data East's Robocop arcade game for 8-bit home computers, converting much of the arcade game while also adding original content to make it different from the arcade original. This version was produced for the Commodore 64, MSX, ZX Spectrum, TRS-80 Color Computer 3, Amstrad CPC, and MS-DOS, meaning that home computers ended up with two different versions of Robocop for North American and European audiences.

Ports for the Apple II, Amiga, and Atari ST; ports for DOS, NES, and TRS-80 Color Computer 3 followed in 1989. The Apple II and IBM PC ports were developed by Quicksilver Software, while the Amiga and Atari ST versions were developed directly by Ocean. The NES version was developed by Sakata SAS Co, and Ocean developed and published a version for the Game Boy in 1990. A port of the game for the Atari Jaguar was planned but never released.

Data East published the game in North America.

Reception 

RoboCop was a commercial success in arcades, especially in Hong Kong where it was the highest-grossing arcade game of 1988. In Japan, Game Machine listed RoboCop on their February 1, 1989 issue as being the second most-successful table arcade unit of the month.

On home computers, the game sold over  copies worldwide. It was especially successful in the United Kingdom, where it was the best-selling home computer game of the 1980s. The ZX Spectrum version in particular was the best-selling home video game of 1989. The ZX Spectrum RoboCop was one of the biggest selling games of all time on that platform and remained in the Spectrum software sales charts for over a year and a half; it entered the charts in December 1988 and was still in the top five in February 1991. It also topped the UK all-format charts for a record 36 weeks until it was knocked off the number one position by Indiana Jones and the Last Crusade in August 1989.

The arcade game was critically well-received. The ZX Spectrum version also achieved critical acclaim, receiving a CRASH Smash award from CRASH, 94% in Sinclair User and Your Sinclair gave 8.8 out of 10, also placing it at number 94 in the Your Sinclair official top 100. The overall opinion was that it captures the original material, with smooth scrolling and animation, sampled speech and sound effects highlighted.

The readers of YS voted it the 9th best game of all time.

The title theme of the Ocean Software versions (composed by Jonathan Dunn) has become well known for its serene, calm tune, which heavily contrasted the tone of both the actual game and the source material; the version of the theme heard in the Game Boy port was later licensed by European kitchen appliance company Ariston for use in a series of TV adverts. The song was also used as the theme song for Charlie Brooker's documentary, How Videogames Changed the World, and was one of Brooker's selections on Desert Island Discs. It was also used as the music for the Internet short, "Dilbert 3" and was sampled in Lil B's song, "In Down Bad", from his mixtape "White Flame".

References

External links 
 
 
 
Review in Compute!'s Gazette
Review in The Rainbow
Review in Info

1988 video games
Amiga 1200 games
Amstrad CPC games
Apple II games
Arcade video games
Atari ST games
Beat 'em ups
Cancelled Atari Jaguar games
Commodore 64 games
Data East arcade games
Data East video games
DOS games
Epic/Sony Records games
Game Boy games
MSX games
Multiplayer and single-player video games
Nintendo Entertainment System games
Ocean Software games
Quicksilver Software games
RoboCop (franchise)
Run and gun games
TRS-80 Color Computer games
Video games about police officers
Video games based on RoboCop
Video games developed in Japan
Video games developed in the United Kingdom
Video games set in Detroit
ZX Spectrum games
Sakata SAS games